Stefano Chimini (born 23 May 1993) is an Italian footballer who plays as a goalkeeper.

Career
Born in Gavardo, Lombardy, Chimini started his career at FeralpiSalò. In August 2009 he left for AlbinoLeffe in a temporary deal, which the club signed him outright in 2011. On 2 September 2011, Chimini received his only call-up from Italy national under-19 football team. He did not play. In 2012, he returned to FeralpiSalò. On 8 January 2013, Chimini was swapped with Paolo Branduani, but Chimini was immediately left for Serie D club Fersina Perginese in a temporary deal.

On 6 August 2013 he was signed by Monza in a co-ownership deal. On 20 June 2014, the co-ownership was renewed. On 26 June 2015 AlbinoLeffe reacquired Chimini.

References

External links
 AIC profile (data by www.football.it) 

Italian footballers
FeralpiSalò players
U.C. AlbinoLeffe players
A.C. Monza players
Serie C players
Association football goalkeepers
1993 births
Living people